The Devils River  in southwestern Texas, part of the Rio Grande drainage basin, has limited areas of whitewater along its length. It flows southwest for  through Val Verde County and empties into the northeastern shore of the Amistad Reservoir, an impoundment of the Rio Grande near Del Rio, Texas on the Texas/Mexico border, .

The Devils River is considered the most unspoiled river in Texas. Its remote location in a hostile environment limits pollution from human and domestic animal populations. In addition, the river flows underground for part of its journey.

The Devils River Conservancy is a 501(c)3 organization dedicated to the protection and preservation of the Devils River for future generations of Texans and works throughout the basin to promote conservation ethics among landowners and paddlers.

Recreation
Although the river is popular for kayaking and canoeing, it is difficult to gain access because much of the river is bounded by private property. However, much of the river is protected through conservation easements on both sides. The Nature Conservancy holds conservation easements on several ranch properties protecting the river. Along with the Devils River State Natural Area the protected land along the river totals .

Traversing the river
The most common point of entry into the river is Bakers Crossing on Texas State Highway 163. Camping sites are available and you can also leave your vehicle at Bakers Crossing. Most of the river is fairly calm with mostly class two rapids and small class three rapids (see International Scale of River Difficulty). However the river can rise and fall greatly with rainfall, even if the rain is not in the direct area of the river. The river is characterized by long, deep pools with reed covered rapids near the end of these pools. A map is strongly suggested as both Dolan Falls and Three Tier Rapids are not able to be seen until you are right on top of them. After Three Tier Rapids, there are no more large (over class III) rapids and the river is fairly smooth. Some boulder and fields do occur past Three Tier Rapids but are generally small in size. From this point it is another  trip on the lake to the last take out at Rough Canyon Marina. The journey for the lake section of the trip can be very strenuous on a person kayaking or canoeing because of the strong south headwind.

The experience
Part of the appeal of the river is its remote location, the very rugged and rough terrain, and lack of human presence. There are only five visible houses in the first  of river. At about  the Dry Devils River flows into the Devils, and is considered by many to be the halfway point. There are many homes in this point of the river and is called the Blue Sage Subdivision.

See also
 List of rivers of Texas
 List of tributaries of the Rio Grande

References

External links

 
Rivers of Texas
Tributaries of the Rio Grande
Rivers of Val Verde County, Texas
Rivers of Sutton County, Texas